The Sand Hutton Miniature Railway was a miniature gauge estate railway serving the estate of Sir Robert Walker, the Fourth Baronet of Sand Hutton, Yorkshire, England.

History

Walker began experimenting with a  gauge miniature railway in 1910. In 1912 he decided to build a miniature railway of that gauge in the grounds of Sand Hutton hall. By the end of the year, 350 yards of track had been laid and the locomotive Synolda had been acquired.

At the outbreak of the First World War in 1914, the railway went into hiatus. Most of the local men joined the war effort and the Hall and grounds largely closed. After the war, Walker returned to the Hall and re-opened it. This longer line was intended to serve as the main transportation system for the estate. A Light Railway Order was applied for and granted, in January 1920.

Work on the extension started in May 1920 with the trackbed being constructed near Warthill station. However much of the new line was steeply graded and it became obvious that a miniature locomotive like Synolda would not be capable of working the new line efficiently. Walker began searching for a more powerful solution to his transportation needs.

In December 1920 the Government announced the sale of the equipment from the  gauge railway at the Deptford Meat Depot. This included track and rolling stock of a much more substantial nature. Walker purchased most of the Deptford equipment and set about converting the miniature railway into the Sand Hutton Light Railway. By 1922 the last remains of the miniature railway were gone and the remaining rolling stock was up for sale.

Rolling stock

The railway used four 4-wheel open carriages built by Basset-Lowke, each seating up to eight passengers. Walker also had two vehicles built at Sand Hutton: a closed bogie salon carriage and a 4-wheel closed brake van. The salon carriage survived the line and passed to the Ravenglass and Eskdale Railway

References

Miniature railways in the United Kingdom
Railway lines opened in 1912
Closed railway lines in Yorkshire and the Humber
15 in gauge railways in England
1912 establishments in England